Madonna Catholic Secondary School is an all-girls secondary school located in Toronto, Ontario, Canada. It is administered by the Toronto Catholic District School Board.

References

External links
 Madonna Catholic Secondary School

High schools in Toronto
Toronto Catholic District School Board
North York
Girls' schools in Canada
Catholic secondary schools in Ontario
Educational institutions established in 1963
1963 establishments in Ontario